Quercus aucheri, the Boz-Pirnal oak is a species of oak tree in the family Fagaceae. It is found in limited portions of the Aegean islands of Greece and parts of Anatolian Turkey. It is placed in section Ilex.

Description 

The species is close to the kermes oak, and not always distinguished from it. However, it differs from that species in some aspects, mainly in having sweet instead of bitter acorns that germinate from the base instead of from the tip. Furthermore, the leaves are often hairy on the underside where the kermes oak's leaves are not. A small species, it can reach 10 meters in height.

Distribution 
The distribution of Quercus aucheri is restricted to the islands of Rhodes, Kos and surrounding islands in the south-eastern Aegean, as well as the south-western coast of Anatolia. Here it occurs mainly in the Muğla, Antalya and Aydın provinces.

References

Sources
 C.Michael Hogan. 2012. Oak. Encyclopedia of Earth. Eds. A.Dawson and C.J.Cleveland. Encyclopedia of Earth. National Council for Science and the Environment. Washington DC

aucheri
Flora of the East Aegean Islands
Flora of Turkey
Taxonomy articles created by Polbot